"I'm Your Woman" is a single by American country music artist Jeanne Pruett.  Released in August 1973, it was the first single from the album Jeanne Pruett.  The song reached #8 on the Billboard Hot Country Singles chart.

Chart performance

References 

1973 singles
Jeanne Pruett songs